Willow Street station is an at-grade light rail station on the A Line of the Los Angeles Metro Rail system. The station is located adjacent to Long Beach Boulevard its intersection with Willow Street, after which the station is named, in the Wrigley neighborhood of Long Beach, California.

South of this station, A Line trains exit the exclusive right-of-way (the historic route of the Pacific Electric Railway) and start their street running portion in the median of Long Beach Boulevard.

Willow is a park and ride station with 920 parking spaces (including a multi-story parking facility) and 10 bike lockers. The Willow Street and Wardlow stations, both in Wrigley, are the two A Line stations closest to the Long Beach Municipal Airport.

History 
The station is on the site of a junction on the Pacific Electric Railway, where the Balboa Line split from the Long Beach Line. At various times, the junction was referred to as Willow, Willows, Willowville and North Long Beach.

Service

Station layout

Hours and frequency

Connections 
, the following connections are available:
 Los Angeles Metro Bus:

Notable places nearby 
 Wrigley Marketplace shopping center
 Long Beach Memorial Medical Center
 Pacific Hospital of Long Beach
 Veterans Park
 Sunnyside Cemetery & Long Beach Cemetery (these adjacent cemeteries on Willow St. date from before 1900).

References 

A Line (Los Angeles Metro) stations
Transportation in Long Beach, California
Railway stations in the United States opened in 1990
1990 establishments in California
Pacific Electric stations